Philipsburg Manor House is a historic house in the Upper Mills section of the former sprawling Colonial-era estate known as Philipsburg Manor. Together with a water mill and trading site the house is operated as a non-profit museum by Historic Hudson Valley. It is located on US 9 in the village of Sleepy Hollow, New York.

Although an English-deeded tract, it is listed by some sources with the patroonships of New Netherland since it incorporated part of that previously owned by Dutch Jonkheer Adriaen van der Donck.

History 

The manor dates from 1693, when wealthy Province of New York merchant Frederick Philipse was granted a charter for  along the Hudson River by the British Crown. He built a facility at the confluence of the Pocantico and Hudson Rivers as a provisioning depot for the family Atlantic sea trade and as headquarters for a worldwide shipping operation. For more than thirty years, Frederick and his wife Margaret, and later his son Adolph shipped hundreds of African men, women, and children as slaves across the Atlantic.

By the mid 18th century, the Philipse family had one of the largest slave-holdings in the colonial North. The family seat of Philipsburg Manor was Philipse Manor Hall in Yonkers

The manor was tenanted by farmers of various European backgrounds, and operated by enslaved Africans. (In 1750, twenty-three enslaved men, women, and children lived and worked at the manor.)

At the outbreak of the American Revolutionary War, the Philipses supported the British, and their landholdings were seized and auctioned off.  The manor house was used during the war, most notably by British General Sir Henry Clinton during military activities in 1779.  It was there that he wrote what is now known as the Philipsburg Proclamation, which declared all Patriot-owned slaves to be free, and that blacks taken prisoner while serving in Patriot forces would be sold into slavery.

Named a National Historic Landmark in 1961, the farm features a stone manor house filled with a collection of 17th- and 18th-century period furnishings, a working water-powered grist mill and millpond, an 18th-century barn, a slave garden, and a reconstructed tenant farm house. Costumed interpreters re-enact life in pre-Revolutionary times, doing chores, milking the cows, and grinding grain in the grist mill. In 2016, historic restoration work sponsored by the New York State Council on the Arts was completed on the grist mill to rebuild the entire wooden waterwheel and flume.

Further reading

 Michael Middleton Dwyer (editor), with a preface by Mark Rockefeller. Great Houses of the Hudson River (Boston MA: Little Brown & Co., 2001).

See also
List of National Historic Landmarks in New York
National Register of Historic Places listings in northern Westchester County, New York

References

External links

 Historic Hudson Valley
 Clemco Construction: 2016 Historic Restoration of Philipsburg Manor Mill

Houses on the National Register of Historic Places in New York (state)
Houses completed in 1693
U.S. Route 9
National Historic Landmarks in New York (state)
National Register of Historic Places in Westchester County, New York
Mill museums in the United States
Living museums in New York (state)
Open-air museums in New York (state)
Grinding mills in New York (state)
Historic house museums in Westchester County, New York
Sleepy Hollow, New York
Grinding mills on the National Register of Historic Places in New York (state)
1693 establishments in the Province of New York

nl:Philipsburg Manor